James Turner Pritchett Jr. (October 27, 1922 – March 15, 2011) was an American actor, best known for his role as Dr. Matt Powers on the soap opera The Doctors. He was born in Lenoir, North Carolina in 1922. He appeared in the serial for its duration, from 1963 to 1982, and was the soap's central cast member, with the Powers character being one of the serial's "tentpole" characters.

In 1978 he won an Emmy for Best Actor for this role.

Before creating his role on The Doctors, Pritchett played the roles of Jeff Nichols on The Secret Storm and Bruce Elliott on the CBS soap opera As the World Turns, a not-so-popular character who was having an affair with the married vixen Lisa Hughes (Eileen Fulton). After The Doctors, Pritchett did a short term role on another CBS soap, Guiding Light.

Pritchett was given an audience with then-President Jimmy Carter in 1978 along with a few other select soap opera actors, such as Eileen Fulton, Susan Lucci, and Dorothy Malone.

Pritchett died aged 88, on March 15, 2011, in New York City, New York.

References

External links
 
 
 James Pritchett - A Life, video tribute (done by his daughter)
 James Pritchett obituary at MLive.com

1922 births
2011 deaths
American male soap opera actors
Daytime Emmy Award winners
Daytime Emmy Award for Outstanding Lead Actor in a Drama Series winners
People from Lenoir, North Carolina